Athletics competitions at the 2007 ALBA Games were held at the Estadio Brígido Iriarte in Caracas, Venezuela, between May 9-12, 2007.

A total of 46 events were contested, 23 by men and 23 by women.

Medal summary
Medal winners and their results were published.  Complete results can be found on the CACAC webpage.

Men

Women

Medal table (unofficial)

Participation (unofficial)
An unofficial count yields the participation of athletes from the following 15 countries:

 

 
 
 
 
 
 
 
 Haïti 
 
 
 Panamá 
 Perú

References

Athletics at the ALBA Games
International athletics competitions hosted by Venezuela
ALBA
2007 in Venezuelan sport